The Firm is the first studio album by British rock band the Firm, released by Atlantic Records on 11 February 1985. Its tracks range from the epic "Midnight Moonlight", based on a previously unreleased song by Led Zeppelin called "Swan Song" – first tinkered with during the Physical Graffiti sessions – to the commercially successful "Radioactive". "Closer" employs a horn section to subtle effect. The album also includes a version of the Righteous Brothers' hit "You've Lost That Lovin' Feelin'".

The Firm peaked at No. 17 on the Billboard 200 chart, and reached No. 15 on the UK Albums Chart. The song "Radioactive" topped Billboard's Top Rock Tracks chart for one week.

Track listing

Personnel

The Firm
Paul Rodgers – lead vocals, acoustic and electric guitars, production
Jimmy Page – acoustic and electric guitars, production
Tony Franklin – fretless bass, keyboards, synthesizer, backing vocals
Chris Slade – drums and percussion

Additional musicians
Steve Dawson – trumpet on "Closer"
Paul "Shilts" Weimar – baritone saxophone on "Closer"
Willie Garnett – tenor saxophone on "Closer"
Don Weller – tenor saxophone solo on "Closer"
Sam Brown, Helen Chappelle & Joy Yates – backing vocals on "You've Lost That Lovin' Feeling" & "Midnight Moonlight"

Production personnel
Stuart Epps – engineering
Gordon Vicary – mastering
Steve Maher – cover artwork
Steve Privett – tape operation; supplier of tea, gin and tonics

Accolades

Charts

Album

Singles

Certifications

References

The Firm (rock band) albums
1985 debut albums
Albums produced by Jimmy Page
Atlantic Records albums